Robert Norman is a former Australian rules footballer who played with Collingwood and Geelong in the Victorian Football League (VFL).. 

Norman was appointed Sorrento's coach for 3 seasons after former Essendon and North Melbourne's Peter O'Sullivan filled the role in 1962. Sorrento defeated Edithvale Aspendale in the 1964 grand final at Mornington by 16 points 13-17-95 to 10-19-79.

Notes

External links  

1937 births
Australian rules footballers from Victoria (Australia)
Collingwood Football Club players
Geelong Football Club players
Horsham Football Club players
Living people